Former National Highway 57 linked Muzaffarpur to  Purnea in the Indian state of Bihar. In 2010 the national highway numbering system was rationalized and renumbered. The entire stretch of the old national highway 57 is now part of new National Highway 27.

Route
This former national highway passed through Muzaffarpur, Darbhanga, Muria, Supaul, Narahia, Narpatganj, Forbesganj, Araria, Jhanjharpur and Purnia.

See also 
 List of National Highways in India by old highway number
 List of National Highways by new numbering
 National Highways Development Project
 Transport in Bihar
 List of National Highways in Bihar

References

External links
 Former NH 57 on OpenStreetMap

57
National highways in India (old numbering)